Robert Wallet was a tennis player competing for France. 

Wallet finished runner-up to Max Decugis in the singles final of the Amateur French Championships in 1907, but took the mixed doubles title at the tournament the same year, alongside A. Péan.

Grand Slam finals

Singles: 1 (0-1)

References

French male tennis players
Year of birth missing
Year of death missing